Basketball: The Pro Game is a video game published by Lance Haffner Games.

Gameplay
Basketball: The Pro Game is a game in which 81 professional basketball teams dating as far back as 1955 are simulated in a text-only game.

Reception
Rick Teverbaugh reviewed Final Four College Basketball and Basketball: The Pro Game for Computer Gaming World, and stated that "Overall, it is a well thought-out pair of games that certainly fills a void in the computer gaming world."

References

External links
Review in Compute!
Article in Ahoy!
Article in PC Games
Article in Guide to Computer Living
Review in Compute!'s Gazette

Basketball video games